Svetlana Vladimirovna Medvedeva ([]; born 15 March 1965) is a Russian economist who was the First Lady of Russia from 2008 to 2012, as the wife of the then president and former prime minister Dmitry Medvedev.

Early years 
Svetlana Linnik was born into a military family in Kronstadt, a town administered by Leningrad. Medvedeva was the youngest child in her family.

Medvedeva was active in extracurricular activities in school, and took an active part in school-held KVNs, spectacles, performances and other events.

In 1987, Medvedeva began studying at the Saint Petersburg State University of Economics and Finance. In her first year at the university, Medvedeva switched to taking evening courses and started working full-time. The Medvedevs married in 1993, after they had completed their studies. In 1995, Medvedeva gave birth to their son, Ilya, and stopped working. In the same year, Medvedeva was baptized into the Russian Orthodox Church.

Political activity 
After the couple moved to Moscow, Medvedeva directed several Russian-Italian initiatives, Sister cities Milan – Saint Petersburg and Venice – Saint Petersburg, which intended to develop tourism between these cities. In 2006, Medvedeva initiated the annual Russian Art Festival in Bari, Italy.

Medvedeva became First Lady when her husband, Dmitry Medvedev, took over as President following his victory in Russian Presidential elections on 7 May 2008. In the same year, Medvedeva headed the initiative for the institution of Family Day in Russia. Medvedeva has already caused something of a media frenzy, even though she shies away from photographers and rarely gives interviews. Medvedeva currently chairs the management council of multi-tier program Spiritual and moral culture of younger generation of Russia created with blessing of Alexy II of Moscow. In an interview, Medvedeva detailed her views on the interaction between the Russian Orthodox Church and the Government of Russia in promoting family policies. Medvedeva has taken up an anti-abortion cause in Russia's efforts to restrict abortion in 2011.

On 20 August 2010, Medvedeva visited the National Gallery and the History Museum of Armenia, along with visiting the Armenian First Lady, Rita Sargsyan. Together they admired the works of various painters, including Ivan Aivazovsky, Vardges Surenyants, Gevorg Bashinjaghyan, and Panos Terlemezyan. Following the exhibition, the Armenian First Lady showed her a 5500-year-old shoe, which was discovered in 2008 in the Vayots Dzor Province.

Medvedeva is an anti-abortion activist, and has been pushing for restrictions on abortion.

Family 
Svetlana married Dmitry Medvedev on 24 December 1993. The couple have a son, Ilya, born on 3 August 1995.

References

External links

1965 births
Living people
People from Kronstadt
First Ladies of Russia
Saint Petersburg University of Economics and Finance alumni
Dmitry Medvedev
Russian anti-abortion activists
Russian Orthodox Christians from Russia
Russian women economists